Trematocara is a genus of cichlids endemic to Lake Tanganyika in Africa. These schooling, light-shy fish are typically found in relatively deep waters, but move closer to the surface at night to feed on plankton. They are mouthbrooders.

Species
There are currently nine recognized species in this genus:

 Trematocara caparti Poll,  1948
 Trematocara kufferathi Poll,  1948
 Trematocara macrostoma Poll,  1952
 Trematocara marginatum Boulenger, 1899
 Trematocara nigrifrons Boulenger,  1906
 Trematocara stigmaticum Poll,  1943
 Trematocara unimaculatum Boulenger,  1901
 Trematocara variabile Poll,  1952
 Trematocara zebra De Vos, Nshombo & Thys van den Audenaerde, 1996

References 

 
Bathybatini
Cichlid genera
Taxa named by George Albert Boulenger
Taxonomy articles created by Polbot